nêhiyawak are a Canadian First Nations indie rock group from Edmonton, Alberta. The band's name is derived from Nêhiyawak, an endonym for the Cree people. The band's debut album nipiy, released in 2019, was a Juno Award nominee for Indigenous Music Album of the Year at the Juno Awards of 2020, and was shortlisted for the 2020 Polaris Music Prize.

The band consists of singer and guitarist Kris Harper, bassist Matthew Cardinal and drummer Marek Tyler, all members of the Cree nation. Their style blends dream pop with shoegaze, sung in both English and Plains Cree. They originally convened to compose and perform the film score for ôtênaw, a documentary film about Cree educator Dwayne Donald; they followed up with a self-titled independent three song EP in 2017 before signing to Arts & Crafts Productions, which released the EP Starlight in 2018 and nipiy in 2019.

References

External links 

 Arts & Crafts Records Page
 Bandcamp Page
 KillBeat Music Page

Canadian indie rock groups
Musical groups from Edmonton
First Nations musical groups
Arts & Crafts Productions artists
Canadian shoegaze musical groups